The Fantastic Expedition of Dillard & Clark is a country rock album by Dillard & Clark. The album was recorded in 1968, shortly after Gene Clark departed the Byrds for the second time, and Doug Dillard left the Dillards. The album is hailed by critics and musicians as a unique masterpiece at the intersection of country rock and Americana.

Background
Clark's debut solo album, Gene Clark with the Gosdin Brothers, had been a commercial failure. After the dismissal of David Crosby from the Byrds, Clark had rejoined his previous band, but after performing only three shows, he left the tour due to his anxieties and fear of flying. He then signed with A&M Records and began sessions for his debut album on his new label with instrumentalist Douglas Dillard. Bernie Leadon co-wrote six of the songs and also performed on the album. Due to Clark's refusal to tour, a short series of shows at The Troubadour in L.A. was the only promotion for the album and, as a result, it too was a commercial failure.

Reception

Music critic Matthew Greenwald, writing for Allmusic, called the album "perhaps [Clark's] most brilliant recording... Graceful, spellbinding, and tasteful all at the same time. Absolutely essential."

Track listing
Side One:
"Out on the Side" (Gene Clark) – 3:49
"She Darked the Sun" (Clark, Bernie Leadon) – 3:10
"Don't Come Rollin'" (Clark, Doug Dillard, Leadon) – 2:54
"Train Leaves Here This Morning" (Clark, Leadon) – 3:49
Side Two:
"With Care from Someone" (Clark, Dillard, Leadon) – 3:49
"The Radio Song" (Clark, Leadon) – 3:01
"Git It On Brother (Git In Line Brother)" (Lester Flatt) – 2:51
"In the Plan" (Clark, Dillard, Leadon) – 2:08
"Something's Wrong" (Clark, Dillard) – 2:57

The following bonus tracks have been included on CD reissues of the album:

"Why Not Your Baby" (Clark) – 3:41
"Lyin' Down the Middle" (Laramy Smith, Clark) – 2:17 
"Don't Be Cruel" (Elvis Presley, Otis Blackwell) – 1:53

Personnel
Adapted from Discogs.
Gene Clark - guitar, harmonica, vocals
Doug Dillard - banjo, fiddle, guitar, vocals 
Bernie Leadon - banjo, guitar, vocals 
David Jackson - double bass
Donald Beck - mandolin, fretted Dobro
Andrew Belling - electric harpsichord (5,6,8)
Chris Hillman - mandolin (7,9)
Joel Larson - drums (1)

Production
Larry Marks – producer
Dick Bogert – recording engineer
Tom Wilkes – art direction
Guy Webster, Homer E. Dillard Jr. – photography
Bob Garcia – liner notes

References

1968 debut albums
A&M Records albums
Dillard & Clark albums